Madeleine "Maddie" McTernan (born 29 December 2000) is an Australian Paralympic swimmer. She represented Australia at the 2020 Summer Paralympics where she won a silver medal.

Personal life 
McTernan has an intellectual disability. In primary school, she attended St Francis Xavier School in Woolgoolga, New South Wales, and in high school, Aquinas College, Southport.

Swimming career 
McTernan is  S14 swimmer. Her swimming started as a child and won her first medal in 2013 whilst a  grade six student. In Coffs Harbour she was coached by Eugene Brogmus. She moved to St Hilda's Swim Club on the Gold Coast to further her swimming career.

At the 2019 World Para Swimming Championships in London, she finished fifth Women's 100 m Backstroke S14 final. She also finished 9th in the Women’s 200m individual medley SM14 and 10th in the Women’s 200m freestyle S14 but did not progress to the finals.

At the 2019 Brisbane INAS Global Games she represented Australia and won two gold in the woman’s II1 4 x 50m freestyle relay and 4 x 200m women’s II1 freestyle relay. She also won 4 silver in the women’s  II1 50m Backstroke, the women’s II1 200m Backstroke, the Women’s 4 x 100m II1 Freestyle relay and the mixed 4 x 100m II1 Freestyle relay and she won a bronze in the Women’s II1 100m Backstroke. International Sports  Federation for Persons with Intellectual Disability Global Games.

In February 2020, she won the 200 m freestyle final at the World Para Swimming Series in Melbourne, her first individual international gold medal. In November  2020, at the Australian Virtual Short Course Championships,  she set a world record in the Women's 400 m Freestyle Multi-class.

At the 2020 Summer Paralympics, McTernan teamed up with Ruby Storm, Ricky Betar and Benjamin Hance in the  Mixed 4 x 100 m freestyle S14. They won the silver medal with a time of 3:46.38, just under 6 seconds behind the winners, Great Britain, who set a world record. She also competed in the Women's 100 m backstroke S14 and qualified for the final, finishing fourth.

At the 2022 World Para Swimming Championships, Madeira, McTernan won two silver medals - Mixed 4 x 100 m Freestyle S14 and Mixed  4 x 100 m Medley relays. She also competed in the Women’s 200m Freestyle S14 where she finished 4th in the final. She finished 5th in the final of the Women’s 100m Backstroke S14. In the Women’s 100m Breaststroke SB14 she finished 12th and did not progress to the final. 

At the 2022 Commonwealth Games, Birmingham, England, she finished 5th in the Women's 200 m freestyle S14.

References

External links 
 
 
 

2000 births
Living people
Intellectual Disability category Paralympic competitors
Female Paralympic swimmers of Australia
Swimmers at the 2020 Summer Paralympics
Paralympic silver medalists for Australia
Paralympic medalists in swimming
Medalists at the 2020 Summer Paralympics
Swimmers at the 2022 Commonwealth Games
Commonwealth Games competitors for Australia
Australian female backstroke swimmers
Australian female freestyle swimmers
S14-classified Paralympic swimmers
21st-century Australian women